The CSV qualification for the 2010 FIVB Volleyball Women's World Championship saw member nations compete for two places at the finals in Japan.

Draw
8 of the 12 CSV national teams entered qualification. The teams were distributed according to their position in the FIVB Senior Women's Rankings as of 5 January 2008 using the serpentine system for their distribution. (Rankings shown in brackets) Teams ranked 1–2 did not compete in the second round, and automatically qualified for the third round.

Second round

Third round

Second round

Pool A
Venue:  Centro Cultural y Deportivo, Buenos Aires, Argentina
Dates: May 31 – June 4, 2009
All times are Argentina Time (UTC−03:00)

|}

|}

Third round

Pool B
Venue:  Ginásio Poliesportivo do Riacho, Contagem and Divino Braga, Betim, Brazil
Dates: July 22–26, 2009
All times are Brasília time (UTC−03:00)

Preliminary round

|}

|}

Final round

Semifinals

|}

3rd place

|}

Final

|}

Final standing

References

External links
 2010 World Championship Qualification

2010 FIVB Volleyball Women's World Championship
2009 in volleyball
FIVB Volleyball World Championship qualification